Never Loved Elvis is the third album by The Wonder Stuff released in 1991. Guest musicians on the album include Kirsty MacColl and Linda McRae.

The song "Mission Drive" was inspired by Wonder Stuff singer Miles Hunt's fall out with best friend and former flatmate Clint Mansell of Pop Will Eat Itself.

The most successful single from the album, "The Size of a Cow", reached No. 5 on the UK singles chart. The album peaked at No. 3 on the albums chart.

Track listing
All tracks composed by The Wonder Stuff; except where indicated

Personnel
Miles Hunt – vocals, guitar, harmonica, percussion
Malcolm Treece – guitar, vocals
Paul Clifford – bass
Martin Gilks – drums, percussion
Martin Bell – fiddle, banjo, guitar, accordion, piano
Kirsty MacColl – backing vocals on "Welcome to the Cheap Seats"
Linda McRae – accordion on "Welcome to the Cheap Seats"
James Taylor – Hammond organ
Judith Fleet – cello
Elly Newton, Alison Gabriel – violin

Charts

References

1991 albums
The Wonder Stuff albums
Polydor Records albums